The Carter Doctrine was a policy proclaimed by President of the United States Jimmy Carter in his State of the Union Address on January 23, 1980, which stated that the United States would use military force, if necessary, to defend its national interests in the Persian Gulf. It was a response to the Soviet Union's intervention in Afghanistan in 1979, and it was intended to deter the Soviet Union, the United States' Cold War adversary, from seeking hegemony in the Persian Gulf region.

The following key sentence, which was written by Zbigniew Brzezinski, President Carter's National Security Adviser, concludes the section:

Let our position be absolutely clear: An attempt by any outside force to gain control of the Persian Gulf region will be regarded as an assault on the vital interests of the United States of America, and such an assault will be repelled by any means necessary, including military force.

Brzezinski modeled the wording on the Truman Doctrine, and insisted the sentence to be included in the speech "to make it very clear that the Soviets should stay away from the Persian Gulf."

In The Prize: The Epic Quest for Oil, Money, and Power, author Daniel Yergin notes that the Carter Doctrine "bore striking similarities" to a 1903 British declaration in which British Foreign Secretary Lord Landsdowne warned Russia and Germany that the British would "regard the establishment of a naval base or of a fortified port in the Persian Gulf by any other power as a very grave menace to British interests, and we should certainly resist it with all the means at our disposal."

Background 

The Persian Gulf region was first proclaimed to be of national interest to the United States during World War II. Petroleum is centrally important to modern armies. The United States, the world's leading oil producer at the time, supplied most of the oil for the Allied armies. Many American strategists were concerned that the war would dangerously reduce the US's oil supply and so they sought to establish good relations with Saudi Arabia, a kingdom with large oil reserves. On February 16, 1943, US President Franklin Roosevelt said, "the defense of Saudi Arabia is vital to the defense of the United States."

On February 14, 1945, while he was returning from the Yalta Conference, Roosevelt met with Saudi Arabian King Ibn Saud on the Great Bitter Lake in the Suez Canal, the first time a US president had visited the Persian Gulf region. During Operation Desert Shield in 1990, US Defense Secretary Dick Cheney cited the landmark meeting between Roosevelt and Ibn Saud as one of the justifications for sending troops to protect Saudi Arabia's border.

In World War II, Britain and the Soviet Union had jointly invaded and partitioned Iran in 1941 which was to end with the conclusion of the war. However, Soviet-aligned rebellions, the Azerbaijan People's Government and Republic of Mahabad, created a crisis in the Allied occupation zone, the Iran crisis of 1946, which was one of the first struggles of the Cold War. U.S. pressure on the Soviets to withdraw from Iran was one of the first postwar conflicts between the two superpowers.

The Persian Gulf region was still regarded as an area of vital importance to the US during the Cold War. Three Cold War American presidential doctrines (the Truman, Eisenhower, and Nixon Doctrines) played roles in forming the Carter Doctrine. The Truman Doctrine, which stated that the US would send military aid to countries threatened by Soviet communism, was used to strengthen both Iran and Saudi Arabia's security. In October 1950, President Truman wrote to Ibn Saud that "the United States is interested in the preservation of the independence and territorial integrity of Saudi Arabia. No threat to your Kingdom could occur which would not be a matter of immediate concern to the United States."

The Eisenhower Doctrine called for US troops to be sent to the Middle East to defend US allies against their Soviet-backed adversaries. Ultimately, the Nixon Doctrine's application provided military aid to Iran and Saudi Arabia so that US allies could ensure peace and stability there. In 1979, the Iranian Revolution and the Soviet intervention of Afghanistan prompted the restatement of US interests in the region in the form of the Carter Doctrine. The Yemenite War of 1979, with Soviet support to South Yemen, may also have been a "smaller shock" contributing to the crisis of that year, and Carter's foreign policy shift. National Security Advisor Zbigniew Brzezinski advised President Carter that the United States's "greatest vulnerability" lay on an arc "stretching from Chittagong through Islamabad to Aden." Henry Kissinger gave Carter similar advice.

In July 1979, responding to a national energy crisis that resulted from the Iranian Revolution, President Carter delivered his "Crisis of Confidence" speech, urging Americans to reduce their energy use to help lessen American dependence on foreign oil supplies. Recently, some scholars have claimed that Carter's energy plan, if it had been fully enacted, would have prevented some of the current economic difficulties caused by the American dependency on foreign oil.

The 1979 oil crisis also led to a vast surge in energy wealth for the oil-rich Soviet Union, which along the lines of resource curse literature, has been hypothesized to have caused the boldness of Soviet Politburo in the intervention in the first place. Previously, the Soviet Union's "Third World" strategy combined largely cautious support of revolutions with covert action. However, the invasion of Afghanistan indicated that Soviet policy had become more direct and belligerent. This was seen to advance a long-term Soviet geopolitical goal, the acquisition of strategic presence on the Indian Ocean, closer to the realm of possibility. This caused previous critics of containment policy to become some of its major supporters.

Over the course of January 1980 in response to the Afghan intervention, Carter withdrew the SALT II treaty from consideration before the Senate, recalled the US Ambassador Thomas J. Watson from Moscow, curtailed grain sales to the Soviet Union, and suspended high-technology exports to the Soviet Union.

The doctrine

President Carter, in his State of the Union Address on January 23, 1980, after stating that Soviet troops in Afghanistan posed "a grave threat to the free movement of Middle East oil," proclaimed:

The region which is now threatened by Soviet troops in Afghanistan is of great strategic importance: It contains more than two-thirds of the world's exportable oil. The Soviet effort to dominate Afghanistan has brought Soviet military forces to within 300 miles of the Indian Ocean and close to the Straits of Hormuz, a waterway through which most of the world's oil must flow. The Soviet Union is now attempting to consolidate a strategic position, therefore, that poses a grave threat to the free movement of Middle East oil.

This situation demands careful thought, steady nerves, and resolute action, not only for this year but for many years to come. It demands collective efforts to meet this new threat to security in the Persian Gulf and in Southwest Asia. It demands the participation of all those who rely on oil from the Middle East and who are concerned with global peace and stability. And it demands consultation and close cooperation with countries in the area which might be threatened.

Meeting this challenge will take national will, diplomatic and political wisdom, economic sacrifice, and, of course, military capability. We must call on the best that is in us to preserve the security of this crucial region.

Let our position be absolutely clear: An attempt by any outside force to gain control of the Persian Gulf region will be regarded as an assault on the vital interests of the United States of America, and such an assault will be repelled by any means necessary, including military force.

Implementation 
The Carter administration began to build up the Rapid Deployment Force, which would eventually become CENTCOM. In the interim, the administration asked Congress to restart Selective Service registration, proposed a five percent increase in military spending for each of the next five years, and expanded the US naval presence in the Persian Gulf and the Indian Ocean.

A negative response came from retired strategist George F. Kennan. United States Senator Edward Kennedy charged that Carter had overreacted, exaggerated the Soviet threat, and failed to act diplomatically. Kennedy repeated these allegations during his 1980 Democratic presidential primary bid, in which he was defeated.

Carter's successor, Ronald Reagan, extended the policy in October 1981 with what is sometimes called the "Reagan Corollary to the Carter Doctrine," which proclaimed that the United States would intervene to protect Saudi Arabia, whose security was believed to be threatened during the Iran–Iraq War. Thus, while the Carter Doctrine warned away outside forces from the region, the Reagan Corollary pledged to secure internal stability. According to diplomat Howard Teicher, "with the enunciation of the Reagan Corollary, the policy groundwork was laid for Operation Desert Storm."

See also 
 Iran–United States relations
 Reagan Doctrine

Notes

References 

 
 Meiertöns, Heiko (2010): The Doctrines of US Security Policy - An Evaluation under International Law, Cambridge University Press,  
 Smith, Gaddis. Morality, Reason, and Power: American Diplomacy in the Carter Years  (1986)
 Stork, Joe. "The Carter doctrine and US bases in the Middle East." Merip Reports 90 (1980): 3-14. online

External links 
 National Security Directive-63 (PDF), a policy outline written by Brzezinski and signed by Carter, giving an overview of the goals of the Carter Doctrine.
 Carter Doctrine and the Gulf War from the Dean Peter Krogh Foreign Affairs Digital Archives
 1980 State of the Union Address, from the American Presidency Project.
 Carter Doctrine in Perspective, US Air Force’s College of Aerospace Doctrine, Research and Education (CADRE) at Maxwell Air Force Base
 Interview with Michael Klare, in which he cites the Carter Doctrine as one of the causes of the 2003 Iraq War.

1980 in American politics
1980 in international relations
Cold War history of the United States
Foreign policy doctrines of the United States
Jimmy Carter
United States–Middle Eastern relations
January 1980 events in the United States